A Bering Strait crossing is a hypothetical bridge or tunnel that would span the relatively narrow and shallow Bering Strait between the Chukotka Peninsula in Russia and the Seward Peninsula in the U.S. state of Alaska. The crossing would provide a connection linking the Americas and Eurasia.

With the two Diomede Islands between the peninsulas, the Bering Strait could be spanned by a bridge or tunnel.

There have been several proposals for a Bering Strait crossing made by various individuals and media outlets. The names used for them include "The Intercontinental Peace Bridge" and "EurasiaAmerica Transport Link". Tunnel names have included "TKMWorld Link" and "AmerAsian Peace Tunnel". In April 2007, Russian government officials told the press that the Russian government would back a US$65 billion plan by a consortium of companies to build a Bering Strait tunnel.

History

19th century 
The concept of an overland connection crossing the Bering Strait goes back before the 20th century. William Gilpin, first governor of the Colorado Territory, envisaged a vast "Cosmopolitan Railway" in 1890 linking the entire world through a series of railways.

Two years later, Joseph Strauss, who went on to design over 400 bridges, and then serve as the project engineer for the Golden Gate Bridge, put forward the first proposal for a Bering Strait rail bridge in his senior thesis.  The project was presented to the government of the Russian Empire, but it was rejected.

20th century 
The proposal was for a 90-year lease, and exclusive mineral rights for  each side of the right-of-way. It was debated by officials and finally turned down on March 20, 1907.

Czar Nicholas II approved the American proposal in 1905 (only as a permission, not much financing from the Czar). Its cost was estimated at $65 million and $300 million, including all the railroads.

These hopes were dashed with the outbreak of the 1905 Russian Revolution followed by World War I.

Interest was renewed during World War II with the completion in 194243 of the Alaska Highway, linking the remote territory of Alaska with Canada and the continental United States. In 1942, the Foreign Policy Association envisioned the highway continuing to link with Nome near the Bering Strait, linked by highway to the railhead at Irkutsk, using an alternative sea-and-air ferry service across the Bering Strait. At the same time the road on the Russian side was extended by building the 2000-kilometer (1250 mi) Kolyma Highway.

In 1958, engineer Tung-Yen Lin suggested the construction of a bridge across the Bering Strait "to foster commerce and understanding between the people of the United States and the Soviet Union".  Ten years later he organized the Inter-Continental Peace Bridge, Inc., a non-profit institution organized to further this proposal.  At that time he made a feasibility study of a Bering Strait bridge and estimated the cost to be $1 billion for the  span.  In 1994 he updated the cost to more than $4 billion. Like Gilpin, Lin envisioned the project as a symbol of international cooperation and unity, and dubbed the project the Intercontinental Peace Bridge.

21st century 
The project would include a tunnel under the Bering Strait and connect to the contiguous United States via Wales, Alaska, along the river to Fairbanks, Alaska, and along the Alaska Highway to Edmonton, Alberta, Canada.

Several American entrepreneurs have also advanced private-sector proposals, such as an Alaska-based limited-liability company founded in 2010 to lobby for a cross-straits connection, and a 2018 cryptocurrency offering to fund the construction of a tunnel. In 2005, investor Neil Bush, younger brother of US President George W. Bush and son of President George H. W. Bush, traveled abroad with Sun Myung Moon of the Unification Church as he promoted a proposal to dig a transportation corridor beneath the Bering Strait. When questioned by Mother Jones during the Republican primary campaign of his brother Jeb Bush a decade later in 2015, he denied having supported the tunnel project and said that he had traveled with Moon because he supported "efforts by faith leaders to call their flock into service to others."

Technical concerns

Distance

Depth of water 
The tides and currents in the area are not severe.

Weather-related challenges

Restrictions on construction work 
This would mean that construction work would likely be restricted to five months of the year, around May to September, and centered during summer.

Exposed steel 
The weather also poses challenges to exposed steel. In Lin's design, concrete covers all structures, to simplify maintenance and to offer additional stiffening.

Ice floes 

Tundra in surrounding regions 

Roads on either side of the strait would likely have to cross tundra, requiring either an unpaved road or some way to avoid the effects of permafrost.

Likely route and expenses

Bridge option 
If the crossing is chosen as a bridge, it would probably connect Wales, Alaska, to a location south of Uelen. The bridge would also likely be divided by the Diomede Islands, which are at the middle of the Bering Strait.

In 1994, Lin estimated the cost of a bridge to be "a few billion" dollars. The roads and railways on each side were estimated to cost $50 billion.  Lin contrasted this cost to petroleum resources "worth trillions". Discovery Channel's Extreme Engineering estimates the cost of a highway, electrified double-track high-speed rail, and pipelines at $105 billion (in 2007 US dollars), five times the original cost of the 1994  Channel Tunnel.

Connections to the rest of the world 
This excludes the cost of new roads and railways to reach the bridge. Aside from the technical challenges of building two  bridges or a more than  tunnel across the strait, another major challenge is that, there is nothing on either side of the Bering Strait to connect the bridge to.

Russian side 
The Russian side of the strait, in particular, is severely lacking in infrastructure.

U.S. side 
On the U.S. side, an estimated  of highways or railroads would have to be built around Norton Sound, through a pass along the Unalakleet River, and along the Yukon River to connect to Manley Hot Springs Road – in other words, a route similar to that of the Iditarod Trail Race. A project to connect Nome,  from the strait, to the rest of Alaska by a paved highway (part of Alaska Route 2) has been proposed by the Alaskan state government, although the very high cost ($2.3 to $2.7 billion, about $5 million per mile, or $3 million per kilometer) has so far prevented construction.

The Alaska Department of Transportation & Public Facilities project was supported by local indigenous groups such as the Tanana Tribal Council.

Track gauge

Another complicating factor is the different track gauges in use. Mainline rail in the US, Canada, China, and the Koreas uses standard gauge of 1435 millimeters. Russia uses the slightly broader Russian gauge of 1520 mm. Solutions to this  break of gauge include:

 To have all cargo in containers, which are fairly easily reloaded from one train to another. This is used on the increasingly popular China–Europe rail freight route, which has two breaks of gauge. It is possible to transfer a 60 container train in one hour.
 Another solution is variable gauge axles for locomotives and rolling stock, such as those made by Talgo. This is faster than is possible with the transfer of ISO containers.

The TKMWorld Link

The TKMWorld Link (Russian: ТрансКонтинентальная магистраль, English: Transcontinental Railway), also called ICL-World Link (Intercontinental link), was a planned 6,000-kilometer link between Siberia and Alaska to deliver oil, natural gas, electricity, and rail passengers to the United States from Russia. Proposed in 2007, the plan included provisions to build a  tunnel under the Bering Strait, which, if built, would become the longest tunnel in the world, surpassing the  Line 3 (Guangzhou Metro) tunnel. The tunnel would be part of a railway joining Yakutsk, the capital of the Russian republic of Yakutia, and Komsomolsk-on-Amur, in the Russian Far East, with the western coast of Alaska. The Bering Strait tunnel was estimated to cost between $10 billion and $12 billion, while the entire project was estimated to cost $65 billion.

In 2008, Russian Prime Minister Vladimir Putin approved the plan to build a railway to the Bering Strait area, as a part of the development plan to run until 2030. The more than  tunnel would run under the Bering Strait between Chukotka, in the Russian far east, and Alaska. The cost was estimated as $66 billion.

In late August 2011, at a conference in Yakutsk in eastern Russia, the plan was backed by some of President Dmitry Medvedev's top officials, including Aleksandr Levinthal, the deputy federal representative for the Russian Far East. It would be a faster, safer, and cheaper way to move freight around the world than container ships, supporters of the idea believed. They estimated it could carry about 3% of global freight and make about $7 billion a year. Shortly after, the Russian government approved the construction of the $65 billion Siberia-Alaska rail and tunnel across the Bering Strait.

Other observers doubt that this will be cheaper than container ships, bearing in mind that the cost for transport from China to Europe by rail is higher than by container ship (except for expensive cargo where lead time is important).

In 2013, the Amur Yakutsk Mainline connecting the Yakutsk railway ( from the strait) with the Trans-Siberian Railway was completed. However, this railway is meant for freight and is too curvy for high-speed passenger trains. The Kolyma–Anadyr highway has started construction, but will be a narrow gravel road.

USCanadaRussiaChina railway
In 2014, reports emerged that China is considering construction of a US-Canada-Russia-China  bullet train that would include a  undersea tunnel crossing the Bering Strait and would allow passengers to travel between the United States and China in about two days.

Although the press remains skeptical of the project, China's state-run China Daily claims that China possesses the necessary technology. It is unknown who is expected to pay for the construction, although China has in other projects offered to build and finance them, and expects the money back in the end through fees or rents.

Trans-Eurasian Belt Development
In 2015, another possible collaboration between China and Russia was reported, part of the Trans-Eurasian Belt Development, a transportation corridor across Siberia that would also include a road bridge with gas and oil pipelines between the easternmost point of Siberia and the westernmost point of Alaska. It would link London and New York by rail and superhighway via Russia if it were to go ahead.

China's Belt and Road Initiative has similar plans, so the project would work in parallel for both countries.

See also

 Artificial island
 A2A Rail
 Bering land bridge
 Cosmopolitan Railway
 Eurasian Land Bridge
 Intercontinental and transoceanic fixed links
 Land reclamation
 Pan-American Highway
 Transportation in Alaska
 Transport in Russia

References

Further reading

External links
 Discovery Channel's Extreme Engineering
 World Peace King Tunnel
 Trans-Global Highway
 The Bering Strait Crossing
 Alaska Canada Rail Link - Project Feasibility Study
 The Bridge Over the Bering Strait by James Cotter
 A Superhighway Across the Bering Strait, The Atlantic
 BART's Underwater Tunnel Withstands Test
 InterBering.com An alaskan company promoting a tunnel under Bering Strait and a railroad between North America and Asia : InterBering LLC

Crossing
Exploratory engineering
International bridges
Proposed bridges in Russia
Proposed bridges in the United States
Proposed railway bridges
Proposed railway lines in Alaska
Proposed railway tunnels in Asia
Proposed railway tunnels in North America
Proposed roads in the United States
Proposed transcontinental crossings
Proposed transport infrastructure in Russia
Proposed transportation infrastructure in the United States
Proposed tunnels in Russia
Proposed tunnels in the United States
Proposed undersea tunnels in Asia
Proposed undersea tunnels in North America
Railroad bridges in Alaska
Railroad tunnels in Alaska
Railway bridges in Russia
Railway tunnels in Russia
Transport in the Russian Far East
Transportation in Unorganized Borough, Alaska
Proposals in the Soviet Union